Lumnitzera racemosa, commonly known as the white-flowered black mangrove, is a species of mangrove in the family Combretaceae. It is found on the eastern coast of Africa and other places in the western Indo-Pacific region. It has one accepted variety from the noniminate species, Lumnitzera racemosa var. lutea (Gaudich.) Exell.

Description
It develops pneumatophores and often has stilt roots. The leaves are arranged spirally at the tips of the shoots; they are simple and obovate, with slightly toothed margins. The inflorescences grow in short spikes in the axils of the leaves or at the tips of the shoots. The flowers are small and white, and are followed by woody, flattened fruits containing a single seed.

Distribution and habitat
This species is native from KwaZulu-Natal to southeast Kenya in the western Indian Ocean, tropical & subtropical Asia to the western Pacific. Its range includes KwaZulu-Natal, Mozambique, Tanzania, Kenya, Madagascar, Aldabra, Seychelles, Chagos Archipelago, Maldives, India, Sri Lanka, Andaman Islands, Nicobar Islands, Bangladesh, Myanmar, Thailand, Cambodia, Vietnam, southeast China, Hainan, Taiwan, Nansei-shoto, Korea, South China Sea, Philippines, Peninsular Malaysia, Jawa, Lesser Sunda Islands, New Guinea, and New Caledonia. In Mozambique it is one of only ten mangrove species. It grows in the higher part of the intertidal zone and is found both on beaches and lining the banks of creeks. It is a fast-growing, pioneering species.

Uses
The timber of Lumnitzera racemosa is strong and durable and has many uses, including bridge construction. The wood is highly favoured for charcoal making in Cambodia. The bark is harvested for the tannins it contains.

Status
Mangroves in general are under threat from coastal development, and this species, which grows on the landward edge of the mangrove area, may be more threatened by rising sea levels than are other species because it may be unable to move further inland. There may be a decline in populations of this species due to habitat loss or harvesting, but it is a common species of mangrove with a very wide range, and is not declining at a sufficient rate to be included in any threatened category, so it is listed by the International Union for Conservation of Nature as being of "least concern".

Common names
The plant is known by a variety of common names. These include krâ:nhob sâ: (sâ:=white< Khmer)

References

Mangroves
Combretaceae
Flora of Aldabra
Flora of Bangladesh
Flora of Cambodia
Flora of Hainan
Flora of India (region)
Flora of Java
Flora of Kenya
Flora of Korea
Flora of KwaZulu-Natal
Flora of Madagascar
Flora of the Maldives
Flora of Mozambique
Flora of Myanmar
Flora of New Caledonia
Flora of New Guinea
Flora of Peninsular Malaysia
Flora of Seychelles
Flora of Southeast China
Flora of Sri Lanka
Flora of Taiwan
Flora of Thailand
Flora of the Andaman Islands
Flora of the Chagos Archipelago
Flora of the Lesser Sunda Islands
Flora of the Nicobar Islands
Flora of the Philippines
Flora of the Ryukyu Islands
Flora of Tanzania
Flora of Vietnam
Trees of Seychelles
Trees of Africa
Plants described in 1803
Western Indo-Pacific flora
Central Indo-Pacific flora